Dan Spielman (born 1979) is an Australian actor. His career spans film, television and theatre.

Spielman grew up with his younger sister in Beaumaris, Melbourne. Without formal acting training, Spielman has worked in theatre, television and film since graduating from high school in 1996 at St Michael's Grammar School, St Kilda, Victoria.

Career
His television roles include Offspring and The Secret Life of Us. More recently he portrayed Ned Banks, the parental journalist brother of The Codes hacker Jesse Banks played by Ashley Zukerman. 

He has won and been nominated for many awards, including the Australian Film Institute Awards (AFI, now AACTA Awards). He was in the 2016 Australian mini-series, Deep Water set in Bondi, Sydney.

Personal life 
In 2005, Spielman became one of the youngest members of the Sydney Theatre Company's ensemble, The Actors' Company. He married Australian actress Yael Stone in 2012 in New York City. In July 2017, Stone announced that her marriage had ended over a year before.

Filmography

Film

Television

Awards
2004: won FCCA Award Best Supporting Actor – Male for: Tom White
1999: won Tropfest award Best Actor – Male for The Date

References

1979 births
Living people
Male actors from Melbourne
Australian male film actors
Australian male stage actors
Australian male television actors
People educated at St Michael's Grammar School
20th-century Australian male actors
21st-century Australian male actors
People from Beaumaris, Victoria